Aimé Joseph Haegeman (19 October 1861 – 19 September 1935) was a Belgian military officer and horse rider.

Haegeman was an officer in the Lancers Regiment and an instructor at the École de cavalerie d'Ypres.

Haegeman competed in the 1900 Olympic Games in Paris. He won the gold medal with his horse, Benton II, in the jumping event.

References

External links

1861 births
1935 deaths
Belgian male equestrians
Olympic gold medalists for Belgium
Olympic equestrians of Belgium
Equestrians at the 1900 Summer Olympics
Olympic medalists in equestrian
Medalists at the 1900 Summer Olympics
Belgian Army officers
Sportspeople from Antwerp Province